Gerald Lyn Early (born April 21, 1952) is an American essayist and American culture critic. He is currently the Merle Kling Professor of Modern letters, of English, African studies, African-American studies, American culture studies, and Director, Center for Joint Projects in the Humanities and Social Sciences at  Washington University in St. Louis, Missouri.

He also served as a consultant on Ken Burns' documentary films Baseball, Jazz, Unforgivable Blackness: The Rise and Fall of Jack Johnson, The War, and Muhammad Ali. He is a regular commentator on National Public Radio's Fresh Air.  His essays have appeared in numerous editions of Best American Essays series. He writes on topics as diverse as American literature, the Korean War, African-American culture, Afro-American autobiography, non-fiction prose, baseball, jazz, prizefighting, Motown, Miles Davis, Muhammad Ali and Sammy Davis Jr.

Background and education
Early was born April 21, 1952, in Philadelphia, the son of Henry Early and Florence Fernandez Oglesby. His father, a baker, died when Early was nine months old, leaving his mother, a preschool teacher, to raise him and his two sisters on her own. Living in a poor area of the city, Early grew up befriending members of the Fifth and the South Street gangs, though he never became a member himself. Instead he focused on scholarly pursuits, graduating cum laude from the University of Pennsylvania in 1974. During Early's undergraduate years, he was introduced to the writings of Amiri Baraka and later credited the poet and playwright with influencing his own work. Early developed much of his writing style through involvement with the university newspaper. Ironically, his first major piece was a journalistic foray into the gang-related murder of a cousin.

After earning his B.A., Early remained in Philadelphia, where he became employed by the city government. He also spent six months monitoring gang activities through the Crisis Intervention Network before resuming his course work at Cornell University, where he eventually earned a doctorate in English literature in 1982. Early landed his first teaching job as an assistant professor of black studies at St. Louis's Washington University in 1982. He would steadily rise to a full professorship in both the English and the renamed African and Afro-American studies departments by 1990.

Personal life
On August 27, 1977, Early married Ida Haynes, a college administrator. They have two children, Linnet Kristen Haynes Early and Rosalind Lenora Haynes Early.

Awards and honors
Early won a Whiting Award in 1988 for creative nonfiction.

For his essay collection The Culture of Bruising: Essays on Prizefighting, Literature, and Modern American Culture, he won the 1994 National Book Critics Circle Award.

He has been nominated twice for the Grammy Award for Best Album Notes. Once in 2001 for Yes I Can! The Sammy Davis Jr. Story and in 2002 for Rhapsodies in Black: Music and Words From The Harlem Renaissance.

On September 5, 2007, Professor Early was honored by Washington University with the unveiling of a portrait painted by Jamie Adams that hangs in the Journals Reading Room of the university's Olin Library.

In 2013 Gerald Early was inducted into the St. Louis Walk of Fame.

On February 19, 2022 the Chicago suburb of Park Forest, Illinois rededicated Early Street, initially named for the confederate general, in Gerald Early’s honor in an effort to celebrate the historic diversity of the village.

Works
Tuxedo Junction: Essays on American Culture (1989)
Life with Daughters:Watching the Miss America Pageant (1990)The Culture of Bruising: Essays on Prizefighting, Literature, and Modern American Culture (1994)Daughters: On Family and Fatherhood (1994) (memoir)One Nation Under a Groove: Motown & American Culture (1994) (music history)How the War in the Streets Is Won: Poems on the Quest of Love and Faith (Time Being Books, 1995) (poetry)Yes I Can! The Sammy Davis Jr. Story (2001) nominated for a Grammy (Best Album Notes)Rhapsodies in Black: Music and Words From the Harlem Renaissance (2002) (nominated for a Grammy Award for Best Album Notes)

Editing workLure and Loathing: Essays on Race, Identity and the Ambivalence of Assimilation (1993)Ain't But a Place: An Anthology of African American Writings About St. Louis (1998)Body Language: Writers on Sport (1998)The Muhammad Ali Reader (1998)Miles Davis and American Culture (2001)The Sammy Davis, Jr. Reader (2001)Black America in the 1960s (2003)My Soul's High Song: The Collected Writings of Countee Cullen (1991)Speech and Power: The African-American Essay in Its Cultural Content'' (1993)

References

External links
Washington University Faculty Page 
Gerald Early. What Is African-American Literature? America. gov. 05 February 2009
DTM interview
Profile at The Whiting Foundation
 http://www.laduenews.com/society/persons-of-interest/persons-of-interest-gerald-early-the-professor-from-south-philly/article_3cf1d44b-93ea-5017-a110-7dc516fdb184.html

Washington University in St. Louis faculty
Black studies scholars
African-American academics
Writers from Philadelphia
American music critics
African-American poets
American male poets
Cornell University alumni
University of Pennsylvania alumni
1952 births
Living people